Tanjong Katong MRT station is a future underground Mass Rapid Transit station on the Thomson-East Coast Line in Marine Parade, Singapore.

The station will be built underneath the intersection of Tanjong Katong Road South and Amber Road.

Description
Tanjong Katong MRT station is a fully underground mass rapid transit station with three station access points. Located below Amber Road and Tanjong Katong Road South, the station is near private residential properties such as Aalto, Amber Skye and King's Mansion.

History
On 15 August 2014, the Land Transport Authority (LTA) announced that Tanjong Katong (then named 'Amber') station would be part of the proposed Thomson East-Coast line (TEL). The station will be constructed as part of Phase 4, consisting of 8 stations between Founders' Memorial and Bayshore, and is expected to be completed in 2024.

Contract T306 for the design and construction of Amber Station was awarded to Woh Hup (Private) Limited at a sum of S$146 million in April 2016. Construction began in 2016, with completion in 2024. Six semi-detached houses along Amber Road and a three-storey apartment block on Tanjong Katong Road were acquired to build the station.

Initially expected to open in 2023, the restrictions on the construction due to the COVID-19 pandemic has led to delays in the line completion, and the date was pushed to 2024.

References

Proposed railway stations in Singapore
Mass Rapid Transit (Singapore) stations
Railway stations scheduled to open in 2024